Timothy Björklund, also known as Timothy Berglund,  is an American artist, animator, story writer, art director, and director of animated film and television from the United States. His sole movie to date, Teacher's Pet, was nominated for a Golden Satellite Award in 2005.

Personal life
Björklund was born in San Francisco, California, United States. He graduated from California Institute of the Arts with a Bachelor of Fine Arts in Film Graphics/Experimental Animation in 1982 and a Master of Fine Arts degree in 1984. He is of Icelandic heritage.

Career
Björklund's film career began in 1993 when he wrote and directed dozens of episodes of the Nickelodeon animated series Rocko's Modern Life. In 2000, Björklund directed some episodes of the Disney animated children's television series Teacher's Pet before directing the 2004 spin-off movie. Between 2004 and 2006, he directed all 40 episodes the Disney animated series Brandy & Mr. Whiskers, of which he was executive producer.

Filmography

As director
Nickelodeon's Rocko's Modern Life (TV series, 1993–96, as Timothy Berglund)
 Film Roman's The Twisted Tales of Felix the Cat (1996–97)
 Teacher's Pet (TV series, 2000-02)
Brandy & Mr. Whiskers (TV series, 2004–06)
Disney's Teacher's Pet (Feature film, 2004)

Other
 Animated the Big Beast Quintet ID for Nickelodeon
 Storyboard work for Kung Fu Magoo (2010)
 Writer and storyboard work for Phineas and Ferb (2008)
 Additional character designer for The SpongeBob SquarePants Movie (2004)
 Model/prop designer for Baby Blues (2000–02)
 Executive Producer, Writer, Director for The Twisted Tales of Felix the Cat (1996–97)
 Storyboard director and writer for Rocko's Modern Life (1993–96) (credited in the show as Timothy Berglund, referred to on Joe Murray's website as Timothy Björklund)
 Visual effects for The Meteor Man (1993)
 Art director/layout artist for "Betty Boop's Hollywood Mystery" (1989)
 Animator for Cocoon: The Return (1988)
 Animator for Willow (1988)
 Animator for Who Framed Roger Rabbit (1988)
 Animator for *batteries not included (1987)
 Animator for One Crazy Summer (1986)

References

External links
 

Year of birth missing (living people)
Living people
American people of Swedish descent
American animated film directors
American animated film producers
Artists from San Francisco
Animators from California
California Institute of the Arts alumni
Walt Disney Animation Studios people
American storyboard artists
American art directors
Background artists
Television producers from California
American television directors
American television writers
Prop designers
Film directors from San Francisco
Screenwriters from California